Love and Sir Lancelot is a 1965 comedy novel by the British writer Richard Gordon. It is the tenth novel in the long-running Doctor series. The medical students of opposite sexes at St Swithan’s Hospital try to get around Sir Lancelot Spratt's attempts to segregate them from each other, while Sir Lancelot's protégé Simon Sparrow becomes involved with a film star.

References

Bibliography
 Pringle, David. Imaginary People: A Who's who of Fictional Characters from the Eighteenth Century to the Present Day. Scolar Press, 1996.

1965 British novels
Novels by Richard Gordon
Comedy novels
Novels set in hospitals
Heinemann (publisher) books